Shijilian station, is a station of Guangfo line of the Foshan Metro and Guangzhou Metro in Foshan's Shunde District. It started operations on 28 December 2016. The station is named after Century Lotus Stadium.

Station layout

Exits

References

Foshan Metro stations
Railway stations in China opened in 2016
Guangzhou Metro stations
Shunde District